The United States presidential candidates in the 2016 United States presidential candidates by political affiliation hold a wide variety of stances on issues related to domestic and foreign policy and their political ideological views.

Domestic policy

Capital punishment

LGBT rights 
Executive positions

Appointments

Abortion 

Executive positions

Appointments

Foreign policy

Iran

Political ideologies

See also 
 Political positions of the Democratic Party presidential primary candidates, 2016
 Political positions of the Republican Party presidential primary candidates, 2016
 Political positions of Hillary Clinton
 Political positions of Donald Trump
 Political positions of Gary Johnson

References 

Political positions of the 2016 United States presidential candidates
2016 United States presidential election